Seno "Inno" Ngutra (born 11 November 1970) is the Indonesian Roman Catholic bishop of Diocese of Amboina, being appointed in 2021.

Born in the town of Waur in Maluku, after high school Ngutra entered the St. Yudas Tadeus Minor Seminary in Langgur and he studied Philosophy and Theology in the interdiocesan Major Seminary of Pineleng in Manado. He was ordained a priest on 6 October 2001 for the diocese of Amboina.

In December 2021 it was announced that Ngutra had been appointed as the fourth Bishop of Amboina, succeeding Petrus Canisius Mandagi, M.S.C. Prior to becoming Bishop of Amboina, he was Secretary of the Diocese of Amboina as well as a Lecturer in Law at St. Francis Xavier's Higher Seminary Church, Poka Rumah Tiga, Ambon. He also worked as a parish priest and a canon law lawyer.

References

External links 
Catholic-Hierarchy.org

1970 births
Living people
21st-century Roman Catholic archbishops in Indonesia
People from Maluku (province)